Neoephemeridae is a family of large squaregill mayflies in the order Ephemeroptera. There are at least four genera and about 17 described species in Neoephemeridae.

Genera
These four genera belong to the family Neoephemeridae:
 Leucorhoenanthus Lestage, 1930
 Neoephemera McDunnough, 1925 (large squaregill mayflies)
 Ochernova Bae & McCafferty, 1998
 Potamanthellus Lestage, 1930

References

Further reading

 
 
 
 

Mayflies
Insect families
Articles created by Qbugbot